Dorothy Elizabeth Robertson (née Rogers, died 1979) was a New Zealand artist.

Background 
Born Dorothy Rogers near Margate, in Kent, England into a family of six children. Her father was a captain in the British Navy and as a result, the family moved around the British Isles. Between the ages of 14–19 years Dorothy drew advertisements for products such as Beecham's Pills which were published in the Daily Mail. After leaving school Dorothy qualified as a nurse and met her future husband, Dr Malcolm Robertson from Christchurch, New Zealand, while working in a hospital. After marrying, Dorothy and her husband returned to New Zealand, where he practiced as an ear, nose and throat surgeon until retiring 30 years later. They had three sons who all became doctors. When the two eldest sons left home to study in England, Dorothy returned to concentrate on her painting. She worked from studios in her home in Christchurch and Takaka, Golden Bay.

Career 
Dorothy's first art work was accepted in 1951 by the Societe des Artistes Francais, at the Grand Palais, Champ-Elysees, Paris. In 1960 Dorothy received a Mention Honourable (award of merit) from the salon. In March 1969, an issue of the French art magazine, 'La Revue Moderne' featured one of Dorothy's paintings, 'Crayfishing, Kaikoura' on its cover and a page inside was devoted to her work. Dorothy exhibited 32 paintings at the Societe des artistes Francais over 25 years. After noting her many success between 1951 and 1974, the director of a famous private art gallery, Galerie Vallombreuse in Biarritz, decided to hold an exhibition of the New Zealander's art.

Despite her success overseas, Dorothy's work was rejected by the Canterbury Society of Arts in her home town of Christchurch, New Zealand. Her work was hung in the Royal Academy in London, the Royal Scottish Academy,  the Society of Women Artists Exhibition in London and many other British galleries. Robertson also exhibited with:

 Auckland Society of Arts
 Canterbury Society of Arts
 New Zealand Academy of Fine Arts

References

Further reading 
Artist files for Dorothy Robertson are held at:
 Robert and Barbara Stewart Library and Archives, Christchurch Art Gallery Te Puna o Waiwhetu
 Hocken Collections Uare Taoka o Hākena
 Te Aka Matua Research Library, Museum of New Zealand Te Papa Tongarewa

1979 deaths
New Zealand painters
People associated with the Canterbury Society of Arts
New Zealand women painters
Date of birth missing
People associated with the Auckland Society of Arts